The 1960 United States Senate election in Michigan was held on November 8, 1960. Incumbent Democratic U.S. Senator Patrick McNamara was re-elected to a second term in office, defeating U.S. Representative Alvin M. Bentley.

Republican primary

Candidates
Alvin Morell Bentley, U.S. Representative from Owosso
Donald S. Leonard, attorney and nominee for Governor in 1954

Results

General election

Results

See also 
 1960 United States Senate elections

References 

1960
Michigan
United States Senate